Neohoplonotus spiniferus is a species of beetle in the family Cerambycidae, and the only species in the genus Neohoplonotus. It was described by Blanchard in Gay 1851.

References

Parmenini
Beetles described in 1851